The Utah Jazz is an American professional basketball team based in Salt Lake City, Utah. They play in the Northwest Division of the Western Conference in the National Basketball Association (NBA).

The team joined the NBA in 1974 as an expansion team called the New Orleans Jazz.  The Jazz relocated to Salt Lake City, Utah in 1979. The Jazz have won two consecutive Western Conference championships in 1997 and 1998. The Jazz have played their home games at Vivint Arena, first known as Delta Center and then the EnergySolutions Arena, since 1991. The Jazz is owned by the estate of Larry H. Miller, and Kevin O'Connor is their general manager.

There have been eight head coaches for the Jazz franchise. The franchise's first head coach was Scotty Robertson, who coached for 14 games. Jerry Sloan is the franchise's all-time leader for the most regular-season games coached (1,673), the most regular-season game wins (1,043), the highest regular-season winning percentage (.623), the most playoff games coached (186), the most playoff-game wins (92), and the highest playoff winning percentage (.495). Sloan is the first coach to win over 1000 games with one NBA team, the leader for the most consecutive seasons coached with the same team in major professional sports history, having coached for 21 seasons with the Jazz, and the only Jazz coach to have been elected into the Basketball Hall of Fame as a coach, having been enshrined in 2009. Layden is also the only coach to have a number retired by the Jazz ("1" in 1988). Elgin Baylor and Layden have spent their entire NBA coaching careers with the Jazz. Sloan had been the head coach of the Jazz from 1988 until his retirement in 2011. From 2011 to the end of the 2013/2014 season the Jazz were coached by Tyrone Corbin. The current coach is Will Hardy.

Key

Coaches

Notes
 A running total of the number of coaches of the Jazz. Thus, any coach who has two or more separate terms as head coach is only counted once.
 Each year is linked to an article about that particular NBA season.

References
General

Specific

Lists of National Basketball Association head coaches by team

Head coaches